Christina Ramberg (21 August 1946–1995) was an American painter associated with the Chicago Imagists, a group of representational artists who attended the School of the Art Institute of Chicago in the late 1960s. The Imagists took their cues from Surrealism, Pop, and West Coast underground comic illustration, and were "enchanted with the abject status of sex in post-war America, particularly as writ on the female form." Ramberg is best known for her depictions of partial female bodies (heads, torsos, hands) forced into submission by undergarments and imagined in odd, erotic predicaments.

Biography 

Christina Ramberg was born on Camp Campbell, a Kentucky military base where her father, Vernon Ramberg, was an army officer. Her mother taught music lessons and due to Vernon's military service, the family moved frequently, including overseas. When Christina was two her family moved to Yokohama in Japan for two-and-a-half-years, and she attended school in Germany during her third and fourth grades. In the United States, the family lived in Kansas, Virginia, and Highwood, Illinois where Christina attended Highland Park High School for her junior and senior year. 

Ramberg earned her Bachelor of Fine Arts in 1968 and her Master of Fine Arts in 1973 both from the School of the Art Institute of Chicago where she studied with Ray Yoshida, who was a primary mentor of the Chicago Imagists group that Christina became a part of. The group also included Jim Nutt, Gladys Nilsson, Roger Brown, and Ed Paschke.
Yoshida encouraged his students in the use of commercial and popular culture images such as comic books and magazines as a basis for their art. In Chicago she met her husband Philip Hanson who was also an student with Yoshida and who is also considered a member of the Chicago Imagists group. They were married in 1968, the same year that they both exhibited their work for the first time in the False Image show at the Hyde Park Art Center. 

Ramberg and Hanson were both faculty members at the School of the Art Institute of Chicago. Hanson later reflected that "students liked her a lot. A good woman teacher was important to them, particularly in that time. It was much more dominated by men, so to have a teacher like Christina, who was doing her own work, that was a big deal. The men could be very nice, but it was really meaningful to learn from another woman." Ramberg and Hanson had one son, Alexander, who was born in 1975, but by 1980 the marriage had become strained, and they eventually agreed to live apart, although they remained close for the rest of their lives. In 1989 Ramberg was diagnosed with Pick's disease or frontotemporal dementia, and Hanson took care of her until she had to go to an assisted living facility. She died in 1995 at the age of forty-nine.

Style and works 
The depiction of the female torso is the most common motif in Ramberg's art, with the torso being corseted, girdled, and otherwise constricted and veiled by the bondage-like trappings of typical 1950s female garments. Ramberg relates a memory of watching her mother dress for a party in an interview: "She would wear these—I guess that they are called 'Merry Widow[s]'—and I can remember being stunned by how it transformed her body, how it pushed up her breasts and slenderized down her waist. I think that the paintings have a lot to do with this, with watching and realizing that a lot of these undergarments totally transform a woman's body. … I thought it was fascinating … in some ways, I thought it was awful." Another distinguishing feature of Ramberg's art is the absence of any faces, with the head not drawn at all, seen only from the back, or concealed by hair. The motif of the "hairdo" is likewise common in Ramberg's oeuvre, the hairstyle also being indicative of a type of mid-century female "conditioning" or conformity. Critic Katheryn Rosenfeld, in a 2000 New Art Examiner review stated: "it's... hard not to read in the work a psycho-sexual inventory of the limitations of white middle-class womanhood at mid-century."

Ramberg's paintings are highly composed and finished to the point that they themselves are referred to as fetishistic. Worked on masonite in acrylic, they are precisely painted and are characterized by their low tone and mute palette. In a 2012 Art in America review by Nancy Princenthal, she describes the draftsmanship in Ramberg's 1970 Corset/Urn series this way: "inky black with spiky pink highlights, they are prim and sexily sinister... deft, dark and reticent." In the 1970s, Ramberg's work evolved from its strict focus on the female form to less sexualized, even non-human forms such as urns, chair backs and shapes "eliding the boundaries between figuration and abstraction, human and object." Her human forms turned from figures seen from the back or in profile to fully frontal torsos that are more rigid and robotic, and have both male and female characteristics which gives her art a sense of androgyny and uncertainty. Still, her signature style remained: crisp, black outlines, muted colors, cropped forms, attention to pattern and detail. By the early 1980s Ramberg took a break from her exploration of the female body and started to quilt more actively than she had in the past. Like her paintings, the patterns in her quilts are crisp and exact, with complex combinations of contrasting colors and forms. In the mid to late 1980s Ramberg's artwork shifted to include a "satellite" motif that incorporated some patterns and shapes from her quilting, while her color palette reverted to the gray, white, blue, and black of her earlier work instead of brighter colors. These later works are referred to as her "satellite" motif phase because the combination of circles, cones triangles, and lines resemble the plans for a telescope, satellite, or some other mechanical invention.

Exhibitions 
Ramberg did more group exhibitions than solo exhibitions during her life time, however she is increasingly gaining recognition in contemporary art circles with exhibitions of her artwork being staged in recent years.

Solo exhibitions 
1974 – Phyllis Kind Gallery, Chicago, also in 1977, 1981 and 1982

1988 – A Retrospective 1968–1988, The Renaissance Society, Chicago

2000 – Drawings, Gallery 400 at University of Illinois at Chicago

2000 – Drawings, Ben Maltz Gallery at Otis College of Art and Design, Los Angeles

2000–-Drawings, Herron Gallery at the Herron School of Art, Indianapolis, IN

2000 – Drawings, Marsh Gallery at University of Richmond Museums, Richmond, VA

2001 – Paintings and Drawings, Adam Baumgold Gallery, New York

2011 – Corset Urns and Other Inventions: 1968–1980, David Nolan Gallery, New York

2013 – Christina Ramberg, The Institute of Contemporary Art (ICA), Boston

2014 – Christina Ramberg (in Glasgow International, Festival 2014), Carlton Place, Glasgow

Group exhibitions 
1968 – False Image, Hyde Park Art Center, Chicago, IL

1969 – False Image II, Hyde Park Art Center, Chicago, IL

1969 – Spirit of the Comics, Institute of Contemporary Art, University of Pennsylvania, Philadelphia

1969 – Don Baum Sez 'Chicago Needs Famous Artists''', Museum of Contemporary Art, Chicago

1970 – Thirteen Chicago Artists, Richard Feigen Gallery, New York

1970 – Surplus Slop from the Windy City, San Francisco Art Institute, San Francisco and at the Sacramento State College of Art Gallery, Sacramento, CA

1971 – The New Curiosity Shop, The Renaissance Society, University of Chicago

1972 – What They're Up To in Chicago, National Gallery of Canada, Ottawa, Canada

1972 – Chicago Imagist Art, Museum of Contemporary Art, Chicago

1972 – Young Chicago Artists, Kalamazoo Institute of Arts, Kalamazoo, MI

1972 – 75th Exhibition by Artists of Chicago and Vicinity, The Art Institute of Chicago

1972 – 1972 Biennial Exhibition, The Whitney Museum of American Art, New York

1973 – Made in Chicago: XII Bienal Sao Paulo, Sao Paulo, Brazil

1974 – Beispiel Eisenstadt IV: Internationale Malerwochen im Burgenland, Landesgalerie im Schloss Esterhazy, Eisenstadt, Austria

1976 – Visions: Painting and Sculpture: Distinguished Alumni from 1945 to the Present, The School of the Art Institute of Chicago

1976 – Old and New Work by Artists from the Phyllis Kind Gallery, Foster Gallery, University of Wisconsin, Eau Claire, WI

1976 – The Chicago Connection, E.B. Crocker Art Gallery, Sacramento, CA; Traveled to: Newport Harbor Art Museum, Newport, CA; Phoenix Art Museum, AZ; Brooks Memorial Art Gallery, Memphis TN; Memorial Art Gallery, University of Rochester, New York

1977 – 76th Exhibition of Artists of Chicago and Vicinity, The Art Institute of Chicago

1978 – Contemporary Chicago Painters, University of Northern Iowa Gallery of Art, Cedar Rapids, IA

1978 – Eleven Chicago Painters, The University of South Florida Gallery of Art, Tallahassee, FL

1979 – Chicago Currents: The Koffler Foundation Collection, National Collection of Fine Arts, Smithsonian Institution, Washington, D.C.

1979 – 1979 Biennial Exhibition, The Whitney Museum of American Art, New York

1980 – American Paintings of the Sixties and Seventies: Selections from the Whitney Museum of American Art, Montgomery Museum of Fine Art, Montgomery, AL 1980 – Renderings of the Modern Woman, Joseloff Gallery of the University of Hartford, Hartford, CT

1980 – Some Recent Art from Chicago, Ackland Art Museum, University of North Carolina, Chapel Hill

1980 – The Figurative Tradition in American Art, The Whitney Museum of American Art, New York

1980 – Who Chicago? An Exhibition of Contemporary Imagists, Ceolfrith Gallery Sunderland Arts Centre London, England; Traveled to: Third Eye Center, Glasgow, Scotland; Scottish National Gallery of Modern Art, Edinburgh, Scotland; Ulster Museum, Belfast, Northern Ireland; Institute of Contemporary Arts (ICA), Boston; Contemporary Arts Center, New Orleans, LA

1981 – A Woman's Place, John Michael Kohler Art Center, Sheboygan, WI

1982 – Fifty National Women in Art, Edison Community College, Fort Myers, FL

1982 – Selections from the Dennis Adrian Collection, Museum of Contemporary Art, Chicago

1982 – Chicago Imagists, Kansas City Art Institute, Kansas City, Missouri; Traveled to: Saginaw Museum of Art, Saginaw, MI

1983 – Contemporary Chicago Imagists, Merwin and Wakeley Gallery, Illinois Wesleyan University, Chicago

1983 – Looking at Women: Images of Women by Contemporary Artists, Artemisia Gallery, Chicago

1983 – Chicago Scene, Mandeville Art Gallery, University of California at San Diego, La Jolla, CA

1984 – Chicago Cross Section, Trisolini Gallery of Ohio University, Athens, OH

1984 – Ten Years of Collecting at the MCA, Museum of Contemporary Art, Chicago

1984 – Artists Call Against U.S. Intervention in Central America and the Caribbean, Dart Gallery, Chicago

1985 – Contemporary Quilts, Karl Oskar Gallery, Westwood Hills, KS

1985 – Imagist Update, Phyllis Kind Gallery, Chicago

1987 – Quilts, Carl Hammer Gallery, Chicago

1987 – Drawings from the Chicago Imagists, The Renaissance Society, University of Chicago

1987 – The Prints of Ten Chicago Imagist Artists, David and Alfred Smart Gallery, University of Chicago

1987 – Surfaces: Two Decades of Painting in Chicago, Terra Museum of American Art, Chicago

1989 – On Kawara: Date Paintings, The Renaissance Society, University of Chicago

1990 – Drawing Invitational: Twenty-Nine Chicago Artists, Sara Spurgeon Gallery, Central Washington University, Ellensburg, WA

1996 – Art in Chicago, 1945–1995, Museum of Contemporary Art, Chicago

1999 – On Paper, Fleischer/Ottman Gallery, Philadelphia

1999 – Quirky, Adam Baumgold Gallery, New York

2002 – Hair Stories, Adam Baumgold Gallery, New York

2004 – Fabulous Histories: Indigenous Anomalies in American Art, Fleisher-Ollman Gallery, Philadelphia

2004 – Soft Edge, Museum of Contemporary Art, Chicago

2006 – Abstract Imagist, Corbett vs. Dempsey, Chicago

2007 – Unsung, Nicole Klagsbrun, New York

2007 – Karl Wirsum: Winsome Works (some) and Hairy Who (and some others), Madison Museum of Contemporary Art, Madison, WI

2008 – Chicago Imagism, Russell Bowman Art Advisory, Chicago

2008 – Girls and Company, Madison Museum of Contemporary Art, Madison, WI

2008 – Everything's Here, Museum of Contemporary Art, Chicago

2010 – Ox-bow Centennial, Corbett vs. Dempsey, Chicago

2011 – Go Figure, Smart Museum at The University of Chicago

2011 – Re:Chicago, DePaul University Art Museum, Chicago

2011 – Chicago Imagists, Madison Museum of Contemporary Art, Madison, WI

2012 – Automaton, Galerie Daniel Buchholz, Cologne

2013 – Sinister Pop, Whitney Museum of American Art, New York

2014 – Liverpool Biennial: A Needle Walks Into a Haystack, Tate Liverpool

2014 – What Nerve! Alternative Figures in American Art, 1960 to the Present, RISD Museum, Providence, RI

2015 – Unorthodox, The Jewish Museum, New York

 Partial list of works Black Widow, 1971. Acrylic on Masonite. Collection of the Illinois State Museum.Untitled (Crying Women), 1968. Felt-tip pen on paper (double-sided).Untitled (Hands), c. 1971. Felt-tip pen, graphite, and colored pencil on graph paper.Waiting Lady, 1972. Acrylic on Masonite.Back to Back, 1973. Etching.Untitled (Skirts Jackets Weaving). Graphite on paper.Rolling Stone, 1983. Cotton.Untitled (Satellite Sketches). Graphite on paper.Wired, 1974–1975. Acrylic on Masonite.Hexagons, Number 1, 1984. Cotton.Hermetic Indecision, 1977. Acrylic on Masonite.Sedimentary Disturbance, 1980. Acrylic on MasoniteFreeze and Melt, 1981. Acrylic on Masonite.Untitled (#126), 1986. Acrylic on linen.Untitled (torso with pants), 1982. Acrylic on Masonite.Untitled (torso with leaf), 1980. Acrylic on Masonite.O.H.D., 1976. Acrylic on Masonite.Corset/Urns, 1970. Acrylic on 8 Masonite panels.Gray Day, 1969. Acrylic on Masonite.Cabbage Head (Side 1), 1968.Hearing, 1981.Japanese Showcase, 1984.Glamour Guide, 1973.Tall Tickler, 1974.Strung (For Bombois), 1975.Chairbacks, 1976Vertical Amnesia, 1980. Collection of the Madison Museum of Contemporary Art, Madison, WIMuscular Alternative, 1979.Apron/Core, 1982.Untitled #129, 1987.Untitled #130, 1987.Hand, 1971.Shady Lacy, 1971.Skirted Vessel, 1982.Cabbage Head (Side 2), 1968.Untitled, 1980.Lola La Lure, 1969.Shadow Panel, 1972.Rose's Woe, 1969.Sore Head, 1969.Hair, 1968.A Cross Breeding, 1978.O.H. #2, 1976.Istrian River Lady, 1974.Untitled #3, 1981.Untitled #1, 1981.Black N Blue Jacket, 1981.No Regrets, 1980.Dull Quilt, 1968.Pearl Rainbow, 1969.Wrapped Ticklers'', 1974.

References

1946 births
1995 deaths
American people of German descent
Painters from Kentucky
20th-century American painters
20th-century American women artists
Artists from Chicago
Painters from Illinois
School of the Art Institute of Chicago alumni
People from Christian County, Kentucky
American women painters